INS Vajrabahu is an Indian Navy submarine base of the Western Naval Command located near Mumbai in Maharashtra. It was commissioned on 1 February 1996.

History
After the Indian Navy acquired the Vela class submarines in 1973 from the Soviet Union, the submarine base operated from temporary facilities in Mumbai. The facilities for the submarine base continued to expand over time. With the commissioning of the Shishumar class submarines, a submarine base complex (SMBC) was commissioned on 22 August 1987 by the then Chief of the Naval Staff Admiral R. H. Tahiliani in Mumbai for the submarine fleet of the Western Naval Command.

This operations base was expanded to include submarine support facilities and commissioned as INS Vajrabahu on 1 February 1996 by Admiral VS Shekhawat. In the ensuing years, a Submarine Motion Control Simulator, Attack Simulator and a water tower building were added to the base.

Objective 
The base operates and maintains a sizable part of the Submarine Arm by providing material and logistic support to the Sindhughosh Class and Shishumar Class submarines based in Mumbai. It also has a non-dieted sick bay and handles preparation and maintenance of individual escape suits for submarine personnel. INS Vajrabahu is the seat of the Commodore Commanding Submarines (West) (COMCOS (W)). The COMCOS is also the commanding officer of the base.

See also 
 Indian Navy 
 Commodore Commanding Submarines (West)
 INS Virbahu
 List of Indian Navy bases
 List of active Indian Navy ships

 Integrated commands and units
 Armed Forces Special Operations Division
 Defence Cyber Agency
 Integrated Defence Staff
 Integrated Space Cell
 Indian Nuclear Command Authority
 Indian Armed Forces
 Special Forces of India

 Other lists
 Strategic Forces Command
 List of Indian Air Force stations
 List of Indian Navy bases
 India's overseas military bases

References

Vajrabahu